GCST can stand for:
 New standard tuning
 "Glycine cleavage system T protein", another name for aminomethyltransferase